"Fingers & Thumbs (Cold Summer's Day)" is a 1995 song by British synthpop duo Erasure. It originally appeared on the soundtrack to the documentary film Wigstock: the Movie, as "Cold Summer's Day." The duo re-recorded it for their seventh studio album, Erasure with new lyrics. Composed by Vince Clarke and Andy Bell, it is an uptempo dance track. Upon the release, the song became Erasure's twenty-second consecutive Top 20 hit on the UK Singles Chart. In Germany, it stopped at number 69, while it was a hit on the US Billboard Hot Dance Music/Club Play, peaking at number 10.

The song was released as the second single from the album by Mute Records in the UK and Elektra Records in the United States. The album version is over six minutes long; the single edit removes an extended instrumental section between the second and third choruses. The B-side is a cover version of "High Energy" (retitled "Hi NRG"), a 1984 number-one US dance chart hit by American singer Evelyn Thomas.

Critical reception
British magazine Music Week wrote, "Initially harking back to a more familiar ground, Clarke and Bell deliver a  hummable four-on-the-floor putdown which transmutes into an epic of scorn."

Music video
A music video was made to accompany the song. It features Bell singing the song as he walks through an amusement park. The actual filming was done in the London Docklands. The video was published on YouTube in September 2014 and as of November 2020, it has got more than 427 000 views.

Track listings

 Cassette single (CMUTE178)
 "Fingers & Thumbs (Cold Summer's Day)" (Single Mix)
 "Hi NRG"

 12" single (12MUTE178)
 "Fingers & Thumbs (Cold Summer's Day)" (Tin Tin Out Remix)
 "Fingers & Thumbs (Cold Summer's Day)" (Tin Tin Out Instrumental)
 "Fingers & Thumbs (Cold Summer's Day)" (Dub on the Moon)
 "Fingers & Thumbs (Cold Summer's Day)" (Twilight Plus)

 CD single #1 (CDMUTE178)
 "Fingers & Thumbs (Cold Summer's Day)" (Single Mix)
 "Hi NRG"
 "Fingers & Thumbs (Cold Summer's Day)" (Twilight 0.2)
 "Fingers & Thumbs (Cold Summer's Day)" (Figures in Crumbs) (a collaboration with Wir)

 CD single #2 (LCDMUTE178)
 "Fingers & Thumbs (Cold Summer's Day)" (Tin Tin Out Remix)
 "Fingers & Thumbs (Cold Summer's Day)" (Dub on the Moon)
 "Fingers & Thumbs (Cold Summer's Day)" (Electrofinger)
 "Fingers & Thumbs (Cold Summer's Day)" (Twilight Plus)

Charts

References

External links
 "Being an extra for the Fingers and Thumbs video", "Erasure Information Service". Retrieved 20 June 2007.

1995 singles
Erasure songs
Songs written by Vince Clarke
Songs written by Andy Bell (singer)
Song recordings produced by Gareth Jones
Mute Records singles